Amanda Donohoe (born 29 June 1962) is an English actress. She first came to public attention at age 16 for her relationship with pop singer Adam Ant, appearing in the music videos for the Adam and the Ants singles "Antmusic" (1980) and "Stand and Deliver" (1981) during their four-year relationship. After making her film debut in Foreign Body (1986), she starred in two films by director Ken Russell: The Lair of the White Worm (1988) and The Rainbow (1989).

She later moved to the United States, where she appeared in films and on television series, including a Golden Globe for Best Supporting Actress-winning performance during her two years (1990–1992) as C.J. Lamb on the NBC drama series L.A. Law. Other television roles include Natasha Wylde on the British soap opera Emmerdale (2009–2010). She has had numerous stage roles, including Yelena in a 1996 Broadway production of Uncle Vanya.

Early life
Donohoe was born in London, to Ted and Joanna Donohoe. She has an older sister, Cordelia. She is of Irish, Russian and Swiss ancestry. Her father worked for the Foreign and Commonwealth Office, which led to her family moving a great deal, with a base in London but also living for periods overseas. After her father's retirement, he joined her mother in her antiques-dealing business.

Educated at the Francis Holland School, at age 15 she met Adam Ant. At 16 she left her parents' home, and moved in with Ant in Notting Hill. In October 1980 she accompanied Ant to the recording of the Top of the Pops performance of "Dog Eat Dog" and in an incident in BBC corridors afterwards, she personally stepped in to physically defend Ant from assault by rival band 4be2 who were also on the premises.  In 1981, Donohoe appeared in the promotional videos for the songs "Antmusic" and "Stand and Deliver" by Adam and the Ants, which were screened on TV when the band were at the height of their fame. Shortly before the band began their 1981 world tour, Donohoe was offered a place at the Central School of Speech and Drama and she left Ant.

Career
After graduation, Donohoe came to the attention of worldwide audiences with her film debut in 1986 when she was cast as Lucy Irvine in Castaway. She followed this with roles in two Ken Russell films, The Lair of the White Worm and The Rainbow.  

After moving to Los Angeles in 1990, Donohoe made her debut on television in the role of lawyer Cara Jean "C.J." Lamb on the American television series L.A. Law in which she appeared during the fifth and sixth seasons of the series. In February 1991, she took part in the first of the so-called "lesbian kiss episodes" on American television when her character privately kissed fellow lawyer Abby Perkins, played by Michele Greene. Some of her other television roles include Murder City, Bad Girls and a guest appearance in Ally McBeal. She had a major supporting role in the comedy film Liar Liar (1997), starring Jim Carrey.

Donohoe made her Broadway debut in a 1995 production of Uncle Vanya, at the Circle in the Square Theatre. She returned to the UK to play Mrs. Robinson in a 2001 stage production of The Graduate.

After moving back to the UK in the early 2000s, Donohoe took the role of DI Susan Alembic in the crime drama Murder City (2004–2006). In 2009 she joined the cast of ITV soap opera Emmerdale as businesswoman Natasha Wylde. Donohoe played the character until leaving the series in November 2010. On 18 and 19 February 2010, she was a guest panellist on Loose Women. She has also lent her voice to the Activision PC video game Santa Fe Mysteries: The Elk Moon Murder as Karen Gordon.

Filmography

Film

Television

Stage

Awards and nominations
Donohoe won a Golden Globe Award for her role in L.A. Law and was nominated for an Outer Critics Circle Award for her Broadway debut in Uncle Vanya.

References

External links

 

1962 births
Living people
Alumni of the Royal Central School of Speech and Drama
English film actresses
English stage actresses
English television actresses
English people of Irish descent
English people of Russian descent
British people of Swiss descent
English soap opera actresses
English expatriates in the United States
Actresses from London
Former Roman Catholics
Best Supporting Actress Golden Globe (television) winners
People educated at Francis Holland School
20th-century English actresses
21st-century English actresses